The 1918 Chicago Cubs season was the 47th season of the Chicago Cubs franchise, the 43rd in the National League and the 3rd at Wrigley Field (then known as "Weeghman Park"). The Cubs finished first in the National League with a record of 84–45, 10.5 games ahead of the second place New York Giants. The team was defeated four games to two by the Boston Red Sox in the 1918 World Series.

Regular season

Season standings

Record vs. opponents

Roster

Player stats

Batting

Starters by position 
Note: Pos = Position; G = Games played; AB = At bats; H = Hits; Avg. = Batting average; HR = Home runs; RBI = Runs batted in

Other batters 
Note: G = Games played; AB = At bats; H = Hits; Avg. = Batting average; HR = Home runs; RBI = Runs batted in

Pitching

Starting pitchers 
Note: G = Games pitched; IP = Innings pitched; W = Wins; L = Losses; ERA = Earned run average; SO = Strikeouts

Other pitchers 
Note: G = Games pitched; IP = Innings pitched; W = Wins; L = Losses; ERA = Earned run average; SO = Strikeouts

Relief pitchers 
Note: G = Games pitched; W = Wins; L = Losses; SV = Saves; ERA = Earned run average; SO = Strikeouts

1918 World Series 

AL Boston Red Sox (4) vs. NL Chicago Cubs (2)

External links
1918 Chicago Cubs season at Baseball Reference

Chicago Cubs seasons
Chicago Cubs season
National League champion seasons
Chicago Cubs